Terence John Doheny (born 2 November 1986) is an Irish professional boxer who held the IBF super-bantamweight title from 2018 to 2019 and challenged for the WBA (Super) super-bantamweight title in 2019.

Professional career

TJ turned professional in 2012 and compiled a record of 19-0 with 14 wins by knockout before challenging and beating Japanese fighter Ryosuke Iwasa to win 
the IBF super bantamweight championship.

Professional boxing record

See also
List of super-bantamweight boxing champions

References

External links

 

1986 births
Living people
People from Portlaoise
Sportspeople from County Laois
Irish expatriates in Australia
Australian male boxers
Irish male boxers
Super-bantamweight boxers
World super-bantamweight boxing champions
International Boxing Federation champions